Zoodoo Zoo is a wildlife park about  from Richmond, Tasmania in Australia.

Zoodoo Zoo is a hands-on safari and native animal park. Visitors are able to feed lions, meet reptiles, and see Tasmanian devils and other Australian native animals up close every day during keeper talks and through close encounter packages. Encounters enable small groups of visitors to book time with a particular animal and keeper to actually enter the animals habitat and interact with them on the choice of the animal to do so. Zoodoo opened in 1999 with a small collection of native rescued and orphaned wildlife species. It has since expanded its facilities and animal collection, with exotic animal species including lions and primates, as well as having a large section dedicated to native animals. In its 21st year of operation the zoo changed hands and management and is now embarking on a new vision for the future and has developed a concept plan and vision strategy to carry it forward in line with evolving needs and expectations of society and for the conservation of biodiversity. The Zoo became accredited with the Zoo Aquarium Association of Australasia in March 2020 and is independently assessed annually for meeting international standards of animal welfare based on the 5 domains model.

As part of its new future the zoo also declared 300 acres behind the zoo of threatened vegetation communities along the Coal River Tier, as a wildlife refuge. The first step of which involved registering the land with The Tasmanian Land Conservancies 'Land for Wildlife' program.

Animals

Native Marsupial Mammals 

 Bare-nosed wombat
 Bennett's wallaby
 Eastern grey kangaroo
 Eastern quoll
 Eastern ringtail possum
 Spotted-tailed quoll
 Squirrel glider
 Sugar glider
 Tasmanian (golden) brushtail possum
 Tasmanian devil
 Tasmanian pademelon

Domestic & Farm Mammals 

 Alpaca
 Arabian camel
 Domestic rabbit
 Guinea pig
 Llama
 Shetland pony

Exotic Mammals 

 African lion
 Brown capuchin monkey
 Cotton-top tamarin
 European fallow deer
 Grant's zebra
 Serval
 White-tufted marmoset

Reptile 

 Eastern blue-tongued lizard

Birds 

 Australian king parrot
 Black swan
 Budgerigar
 Cockatiel
 Common ostrich
 Eclectus parrot
 Emu
 Fischer's lovebird
 Helmeted guinea fowl
 Indian ringneck parakeet
 Long-billed corella
 Mandarin duck
 Rainbow lorikeet
 Red-tailed black cockatoo
 Short-billed corella
 Silkie chicken
 Sulphur crested cockatoo

References

External links
 
 

1999 establishments in Australia
Zoos established in 1999
Parks in Tasmania
Zoos in Tasmania
Wildlife parks in Australia